Soldiers Without Uniform is a 1942 short Australian programme about Australian industry during World War II directed by Charles Chauvel.

References

External links

Soldiers Without Uniform at National Film and Sound Archive
Soldiers Without Uniform at Australian Screen Online

1942 films
Australian short documentary films
1940s Australian films